The Sussex Cup is a greyhound racing competition held annually at Brighton & Hove Greyhound Stadium.

It was inaugurated in 1972 and is a category 1 event on the annual racing calendar.

Past winners

Venues & Distances
1972–present (Hove 515m)

Sponsors
1998–2004 (Chas Miller Bookmakers)
2005–present (Coral)

References

Greyhound racing competitions in the United Kingdom
Sport in Brighton and Hove
Recurring sporting events established in 1972